A carafe is a glass container with a flared lip used for serving liquids, especially wine and coffee.  Unlike the related decanter, carafes generally do not include stoppers. Coffee pots included in coffee makers are also referred to as carafes in American English.

Usage

In France, carafes are commonly used to serve water. To order a carafe d'eau ("carafe of water") is to request to be served (free) tap water rather than bottled water at a cost. In Greece, in tavernas or similar establishments, carafes are normally used to serve draught wine. Carafes are also used to serve coffee; these carafes come in glass or thermal variants used for certain purposes, such as storing larger amounts of coffee without affecting the taste or keeping the coffee warm for extended periods.

See also 

 Wine accessory
 Wine tasting

References

External links 

 

Kitchenware
Liquid containers
Wine accessories
Vessels